This is a list of defunct airlines of Hungary.

See also
 List of airlines of Hungary
 List of airports in Hungary

References

Hungary
Airlines
Airlines, defunct